Malawi Law Society is a legal membership organization that unites all lawyers in Malawi. It is administered by an elected executive board.

Malawi Legal Information Institute (MLII)

The Malawi Legal Information Institute is a division of the MLS. It is a source of public legal information relating to legal judgements and rulings in Malawi.

Malawi Law Journal(MLJ)

The Malawi Law Journal (MLJ) is a peer reviewed publication sponsored by the Malawi Law Society, University of Malawi, and Malawian scholars across the globe. Its current editor-in-chief is Danwood M Chirwa.

External links
Malawi Law Society
Malawi Law Journal
 Malawi Legal Information Institute

References

Law of Malawi